Pointless Nostalgic is Jamie Cullum's second album but his first major release on a record label. It was released in 2002 through Candid Records. It was recorded at Clowns Pocket Recording Studio, Bexley, Kent by Derek Nash who also co produced the CD.

Track listing

Musicians 
 Jamie Cullum – piano, vocals
 Martin Shaw – trumpet
 Martin Gladdish – trombone
 Matt Wates – alto saxophone
 Dave O'Higgins – tenor saxophone
 Ben Castle – tenor saxophone
 Geoff Gascoyne – bass
 Sebastiaan de Krom – drums

Charts and certifications

Weekly charts

Certifications

References

2002 albums
Jamie Cullum albums
Candid Records albums